Trogosus is an extinct genus of tillodont mammal. Fossils have been found in Wyoming, California, and British Columbia, and date from the Eocene between 54.8 and 33.7 million years ago.
It had large, rodent-like incisors, which continued growing throughout the creature's life. Judging from the heavily worn molar teeth, Trogosus fed on rough plant material, such as roots and tubers.

Notes

References

 
 
 
 

Tillodontia
Eocene mammals of North America
Fossil taxa described in 1871
Prehistoric mammal genera